Pucketa Creek is a tributary of the Allegheny River located in both Allegheny and Westmoreland counties in the U.S. state of Pennsylvania.

Course
Pucketa Creek joins the Allegheny River where the creek forms the boundary between both the city of Lower Burrell and the borough of Plum.

Tributaries
The Little Pucketa Creek joins Pucketa Creek at Lower Burrell.

See also
List of rivers of Pennsylvania
List of tributaries of the Allegheny River

References

External links

U.S. Geological Survey: PA stream gaging stations

Rivers of Pennsylvania
Tributaries of the Allegheny River
Rivers of Allegheny County, Pennsylvania
Rivers of Westmoreland County, Pennsylvania